Bulloch Academy is an independent, grades PK-12 school in Bulloch County, Georgia, that was founded as a segregation academy.

History
Bulloch Academy was created as a segregation academy in order to continue providing white-only education in Statesboro, Georgia. It was built and supported by various economic and political elites from the white community after federally mandated integration was enacted.

Demographics
As of the 2019-2020 school year, the student population was less than 2% black though the school district in which it resides was 28% black.

References

External links
 

Private elementary schools in Georgia (U.S. state)
Private middle schools in Georgia (U.S. state)
Private high schools in Georgia (U.S. state)
Schools in Bulloch County, Georgia
Preparatory schools in Georgia (U.S. state)